This is a list of Spanish heads of state, that is, kings and presidents that governed the country of Spain in the modern sense of the word. The forerunners of the Spanish throne were the following:
Kings of Asturias
Kings of Navarre 
Kings of León
Kings of Galicia
Kings of Aragon
Kings of Castile

These lineages were eventually united by the marriage of the Catholic Monarchs, Ferdinand II of Aragon (king of the Crown of Aragon) and Isabella I of Castile (queen of the Crown of Castile). Although their kingdoms continued to be separate, with their personal union they ruled them together as one dominion. Spain was thereafter governed as a dynastic union by the House of Trastámara, the House of Habsburg, and the House of Bourbon until the Nueva Planta decrees merged Castile and Aragon into one kingdom.

During the First Spanish Republic (1873–1874), Spain had heads of state known as the President of the Executive Power. However, it is only during the Second Spanish Republic (1931–1939) that the official title of President of Spain (or President of the Republic) existed. Today, Spain is a constitutional monarchy, and there is thus no person holding the title of President of Spain. However, the prime minister holds the official title of President of the Government.

Kingdom of Spain (1479–1873)

House of Trastámara (1479–1555)
Under Isabella and Ferdinand, the royal dynasties of Castile and Aragon, their respective kingdoms, were united into a single line. Historiography of Spain generally treats this as the formation of the kingdom of Spain, but in actuality, the two kingdoms continued for many centuries with their own separate institutions. It was not until the Nueva Planta decrees of the early 18th century that the two lands were formally merged into a single state.

House of Habsburg (1516–1700)

Following the deaths of Isabella (1504) and Ferdinand (1516), their daughter Joanna inherited the Spanish kingdoms. However, she was kept prisoner at Tordesillas due to her mental disorder. As Joanna's son, Charles I (the future Holy Roman Emperor, Charles V), did not want to be merely a regent, he proclaimed himself king of Castile and Aragon jointly with his mother. Subsequently, the Castilian and Aragonese Cortes alleged oath to him as co-monarch with his mother. Upon her death, he became sole King of Castile and Aragon, and the thrones were left permanently united to Philip II of Spain and successors. Traditional numbering of monarchs follows the Castillian crown; i.e. after King Ferdinand (II of Aragon and V of Castile jure uxoris as husband of Queen of Castille Isabella I), the next Ferdinand was numbered VI. Likewise, Alfonso XII takes his number following that of Alfonso XI of Castile rather than that of Alfonso V of Aragon, the prior Spanish monarchs with that name.

Disputed claimant

In 1700 Charles II died. Charles' will named the 16-year-old Philip, the grandson of Charles' sister Maria Theresa of Spain and King Louis XIV of France, as his successor to the whole Spanish Empire. Upon any possible refusal of the undivided Spanish possessions, the Crown of Spain would be offered next to Philip's younger brother Charles, duc de Berry, or, next, to Archduke Charles of Austria.

Archduke Charles of Austria had a legal right to the Spanish throne due to the fact that Charles's father, Leopold I, Holy Roman Emperor, was the son of Charles' aunt Maria Anna of Austria, but Philip still had the better claim because Philip's grandfather, King Louis XIV of France, was the son of Charles' aunt Anne of Austria, the older of the sisters of Philip IV. However, Philip IV had stipulated in his will the succession should pass to the Austrian Habsburg line, and the Austrian branch also claimed that Maria Theresa of Spain, Philip's grandmother, had renounced the Spanish throne for herself and her descendants as part of her marriage contract. This was countered by the French claim that it was on the basis of a dowry that had never been paid.

Thus, the war broke out and Archduke Charles was proclaimed king of Spain, as Charles III, opposite to Philip V. Charles renounced his claims to the Spanish throne in the Treaty of Rastatt of 1714, but was allowed the continued use of the styles of a Spanish monarch for his lifetime. Philip ascended the Spanish throne but forever renounced his claim to the throne of France for himself and his descendants.

House of Bourbon (1700–1808)

House of Bonaparte (1808–1813)

The only monarch from this dynasty was Joseph I, imposed by his brother Napoleon I of France after Charles IV and Ferdinand VII had abdicated. The title used by Joseph was King of the Spains and the Indias, by divine grace and the Constitution of the State. He was also later given all of the titles of the previous kings. A government in opposition to the French was formed in Cádiz on 25 September 1808, which continued to recognize the imprisoned Ferdinand VII as king. This government was diplomatically recognized as the legitimate Spanish government by Britain and other countries at war with France.

House of Bourbon (1813–1868; first restoration)

Charles IV's eldest son was restored to the throne. Again the title used was king of Castile, Leon, Aragon,… by divine grace.

House of Savoy (1870–1873)

After the Spanish Revolution of 1868 deposed Isabella II, there was established a provisional government and a regency headed by Francisco Serrano y Domínguez, who acted as Head of State, from October 8, 1868 until December 4, 1870 while it was requested a new monarch. Amadeo I was elected as king and the new title used was King of Spain, by divine grace and will of nation.

First Spanish Republic (1873–1874)
The First Spanish Republic started with the abdication as King of Spain on February 10, 1873 of Amadeo I, following the Hidalgo Affair, when he had been required by the radical government to sign a decree against the artillery officers. The next day, February 11, the republic was declared by a parliamentary majority made up of radicals, republicans and democrats. It lasted twenty-three months.

Presidents of the Republic

Kingdom of Spain (1874–1931)

House of Bourbon (1874–1931; second restoration)
Isabella II's eldest son was restored to the throne. Constitutional king of Spain. Between the death of Alfonso XII and the birth of Alfonso XIII, there was a period of seven months where the pregnant Queen Maria Christina served as Head of State with the title of Regent for her daughter Maria de las Mercedes, who was declared to be "Queen in Name" until the gender of her baby sibling was known.

Second Spanish Republic (1931–1939)
The Second Spanish Republic was the system of government in Spain between April 14, 1931 when Alfonso XIII left the country following a period of social unrest after the collapse of General Primo de Rivera's dictatorship a year earlier, and April 1, 1939 when the last of the Republican (republicanos) forces surrendered to the Nationalist (nacionales) forces led by Francisco Franco, at the end of the Spanish Civil War.

Presidents of the Republic

Spanish Republican government in exile (1939–1977)
Presidents in exile

Francoist Spain (1936–1975)
On October 1, 1936 General Francisco Franco was proclaimed Head of State (Caudillo) in parts of Spain controlled by Nationalist (nacionales) forces after the Spanish Civil War broke out. After the end of war on April 1, 1939 General Franco took control of the whole of Spain. In 1947, Franco proclaimed the restoration of the monarchy, but did not allow the pretender, Juan de Borbón, Count of Barcelona, to take the throne. In 1969, Franco declared that Juan Carlos, styled as the Prince of Spain, the Count of Barcelona's son, would be his successor. After Franco's death in 1975, Juan Carlos succeeded him as the King of Spain.

Kingdom of Spain (1975–present)

House of Bourbon (1975–present; third restoration)
Alfonso XIII's claim descended (due to his two eldest sons' renunciations) to his third son, Infante Juan, Count of Barcelona, who was passed over in favour of his eldest son, whose title became King of Spain. The Count of Barcelona renounced his claims in favour of his son in 1977, two years after Franco's death and Juan Carlos's accession.

Juan Carlos abdicated in favor of his son Felipe VI, who became King on 19 June 2014, with Felipe's oldest daughter Infanta Leonor next in succession.

See also

Monarchy of Spain
List of Spanish monarchs
List of Spanish regents
Monarchs of Spain family tree
Succession to the Spanish throne
List of Spanish consorts
War of the Spanish Succession
President of the Republic (Spain)
Prime Minister of Spain
List of prime ministers of Spain
Carlism – about pretenders who have tried to substitute the Isabelline monarchs.

References

External links
Monarchs of Spain (700–present)

Spain
Heads of state of Spain
Heads of state

Lists of Spanish nobility